"Alive" is a song by American Christian metal band P.O.D. It was released on July 31, 2001, as the lead single from their second major-label studio album, Satellite (2001). It is one of the band's most popular songs. The "Alive" CD single was first released in 2001 and then again in 2002 with alternative cover art and tracks. A semi-acoustic remix was included as a bonus track on the special edition re-release of Satellite available August 27, 2002.

Background
The lyrics to the track were written by vocalist Sonny Sandoval and were inspired by a moment when he recognised his own features in those of his young daughter for the first time.

The song debuted just prior to the September 11, 2001, attacks and benefited by offering a positive message during hard times. As such, "Alive" went on to become one of MTV's and MTV2's most played videos of 2001 and became a huge pop hit. Guitarist Marcos Curiel mentioned the song's relevance in a 2008 interview: "There's just way too much negativity going on in our everyday lives. When you can hear something that's going to uplift you like 'Alive' or something that's going to bring out knowledge like 'Youth of the Nation,' we've done our jobs as an artist. We're trying to be relevant with the people."

Sonny Sandoval stated, "We didn't have a name for it, but we were calling it 'Beautiful' because it made us feel beautiful. And that drove the direction of the lyrical content, because we wanted people to go, 'Hey, this makes me feel good.' We recorded the chorus I don't know how many times, because it was like, 'Let's take it up a notch. Let's take it higher.'"

Music video
Directed by Francis Lawrence with special effects by Pixel Envy, the "Alive" video made its television debut on August 20, 2001. It boasts a massive car wreck filmed under a freeway intersection in the San Fernando Valley in mid-2001. Lawrence had conceived the idea years prior but was unsuccessful in pitching it to bands. Upon filming "Alive," Lawrence stated "I'm so glad I didn't get those jobs, because this was so perfect." His idea developed further upon shooting the video by focusing on a wild day in the life of a teenager. Lawrence elaborate:
"I've done emotional videos before, but having kid stuff like – surfing, skating, making out – plus the visual punch of the car accident. It packs it all."
Lawrence also modified scenes from his original concept; the boy is shown emerging from the demolished car unscathed rather than not appearing at all, and he makes out with his girlfriend in a train tunnel rather than implying sex in a bedroom as Lawrence previously envisioned. All of the effects and work behind "Alive" were detailed in a retrospective MTV article in August 2002.

While it did not win any, "Alive" was one of the most nominated videos at the 2002 MTV Video Music Awards ceremony. However, it did win two other awards in addition to the five VMA nominations. The video was also No. 2 on TVU's 50 Best Videos of All Time list.

Performances
When the song became the most requested video on TRL in September 2001, rather than simply having the video aired, P.O.D. performed a live, hour-long set at Battery Park. This was despite Sandoval battling a severe cold. The song was performed on The Tonight Show with Jay Leno on October 5, 2001. It was originally planned for the prior month but rescheduled due to the September 11 attacks. Not including encores, "Alive" typically ends P.O.D.'s concert setlist.

Awards

2001 San Diego Music Awards
 Song of the Year

2002 Grammy Awards
 Best Hard Rock Performance (nomination)

2002 MTV Video Music Awards
 Video of the Year (nomination)
 Best Group Video (nomination)
 Best Direction in a Video – Francis Lawrence (nomination)
 Best Special Effects in a Video – Pixel Envy (nomination)
 Viewer's Choice (nomination)

2002 MVPA Awards
 Rock Video of the Year

Track listings

UK enhanced CD single
 "Alive" (album version) – 3:22
 "School of Hard Knocks" – 4:04
 "Lie Down" (demo) – 4:20
 "Alive" (enhanced video)

UK cassette single
 "Alive" (album version) – 3:22
 "School of Hard Knocks" – 4:04
 "Lie Down" (demo) – 4:20

European CD single
 "Alive" (album version)
 "School of Hard Knocks"

Australian CD single
 "Alive" (album version)
 "Lie Down" (demo)
 "Sabbath"

Charts

Weekly charts

Year-end charts

Release history

References

P.O.D. songs
2001 singles
Music videos directed by Francis Lawrence
2001 songs
Song recordings produced by Howard Benson
Atlantic Records singles
Songs written by Noah Bernardo
Songs written by Marcos Curiel
Songs written by Traa Daniels
Songs written by Sonny Sandoval